General antiparticle spectrometer (GAPS) is a planned experiment that will use a high-altitude balloon flying in Antarctica to look for antideuteron particles from outer space cosmic rays, in an effort to search for dark matter. Anti-deuterons could perhaps be produced by the annihilation of hypothetical weakly interacting massive particles (WIMPs). The goal of the GAPS experiment is to capture anti-deuterons in a target material, to form an exotic atom in an excited state. The exotic atom would quickly decay, producing detectable X-rays energies with pion signature from nuclear annihilation.

The GAPS ground test was successfully using a particle accelerator at KEK in 2004 and 2005. The first high-altitude balloon test was done in June 2012 with six Si(Li) detectors.

GAPS team
The team includes:
 Columbia University T. Aramaki, C.J. Hailey (P.I.), N. Madden, K. Mori, Florian Gahbauer
 University of California, San Diego S.E. Boggs
 University of California, Los Angeles R.A. Ong, J. Zweerink, S. A. I. Mognet
 University of Hawaii P. Von Doetinchem
 Lawrence Livermore National Laboratory W.W. Craig
 Japan Aerospace Exploration Agency – Institute of Space & Astronautical Science, N. Bando, H. Fuke, T. Yoshida
 Massachusetts Institute of Technology K. Perez

References

Further reading
Astrophysics,  High Energy Astrophysical Phenomena, Antideuteron Sensitivity for the GAPS Experiment, by T. Aramaki, C.J. Hailey, S.E. Boggs, P. von Doetinchem, H. Fuke, S.I. Mognet, R.A. Ong, K. Perez, J. Zweerink, 8 June 2015
uchicago.edu, Antideuteron Signatures of Dark Matter with the GAPS Experiment, by Kerstin Perez Haverford College/Columbia University, U. Chicago HEP Seminar, February 16, 2015
IOP science, Journal of Cosmology and Astroparticle Physics Volume 2006 January 2006, C J Hailey
Gizmag, Dark matter, WIMPS, and NASA's Alpha Magnetic Spectrometer data, By Brian Dodson, May 19, 2013
UCLA, UCLA Department of Physics and Astronomy, GAPS (General Antiparticle Spectrometer) project
NASA, The General Antiparticle Spectrometer Experiment: Search for Dark Matter and Primordial Black Holes, by Charles J. Hailey (for the GAPS Collaboration), Columbia Astrophysics Laboratory, Columbia University.
Columbia University, General Antiparticle Spectrometer Experiment, (GAPS): Recent Progress and Future Plans, C. J. Hailey, T. Aramaki, H. Fuke†, J.E. Koglin, K. Mori, N. Madden and T. Yoshida.
Cornell University, The General Antiparticle Spectrometer (GAPS) – Hunt for dark matter using low-energy antideuterons, by Ph. von Doetinchem, T. Aramaki, St. Boggs, W. Craig, H. Fuke, F. Gahbauer, Ch. Hailey, J. Koglin, N. Madden, I. Mognet, K. Mori, R. Ong, T. Yoshida, T. Zhang, J. Zweerink, submitted on 1 December 2010.

External links
 JAXA/ISAS GAPS page 

Spectrometers
Experimental particle physics
Physics experiments